Lachenalia klinghardtiana is a species of plant in the family Asparagaceae. It is endemic to Namibia.  Its natural habitat is cold desert.

References

Flora of Namibia
klinghardtiana
Least concern plants
Taxonomy articles created by Polbot
Taxa named by Kurt Dinter